Birgitta Carlsson (born February 3, 1943) is a Swedish Centre Party politician. She was a member of the Riksdag from 1991 until 2006.

External links
Birgitta Carlsson at the Riksdag website

1943 births
Living people
Members of the Riksdag from the Centre Party (Sweden)
Women members of the Riksdag
Members of the Riksdag 1991–1994
Members of the Riksdag 1994–1998
Members of the Riksdag 1998–2002
Members of the Riksdag 2002–2006
21st-century Swedish women politicians
Place of birth missing (living people)
20th-century Swedish women politicians
20th-century Swedish politicians